Sveio is the administrative centre of Sveio municipality in Vestland county, Norway.  The village is located on the northwestern shore of the lake Vigdarvatnet, about half-way between the villages of Våga and Førde. The village lies along Norwegian County Road 47.  Sveio Church is located here. The newspaper Vestavind has been published in Sveio since 1986.

References

Villages in Vestland
Sveio